Omar Christopher Lye-Fook MBE (born 14 October 1968), known professionally as Omar, is an English singer, songwriter and actor. He grew up in Canterbury, Kent, and learned his craft classically, playing the trumpet, piano and percussion. He also spent two years at Chetham's School of Music in Manchester and the Guildhall School of Music in London. His most well-known song was his debut single "There's Nothing Like This". It reached number 14 in the UK Singles Chart on re-release in 1991. In 2022, he appeared in EastEnders as Avery Baker.

Career
Following his first two single releases, "Mr Postman" (1985) and "You and Me" (1988) featuring backing vocals from Caron Wheeler, Omar released his debut album, There's Nothing Like This, in 1990. Initially released on his father's record label, Kongo Records, it entered the UK Albums Chart, peaking at No. 54. Signing to his first major record label Talkin' Loud saw the re-release of his debut album, which climbed to No. 19 in the UK Albums Chart. This was followed in 1992 by his second album, Music, which proved less successful than the first, peaking at No. 37. A new signing to RCA Records led to Omar undertaking collaborations with other musicians, including Lamont Dozier, David Frank (The System), the former Heatwave bassist Derrick Bramble, Leon Ware and Stevie Wonder. In 1996, Omar contributed "Water to Drink" to the AIDS benefit album, Red Hot + Rio, produced by the Red Hot Organization.

In 2003, after one of his songs ("There's Nothing Like This") was used in the intro round on Never Mind the Buzzcocks, presenter Mark Lamarr questioned Omar's supposed instant recognisability, quipping that he would require a Blockbuster card to confirm Omar's identity. Omar's agent e-mailed the show, and, a few episodes later, Omar appeared in the show's 'identity parade' round, Blockbuster card in hand. Lamarr was forced to concede that Omar was both immediately recognisable, and a rather more significant artist than he had earlier given him credit for. In 2006, the Urban Music Awards presented Omar with the Best Neo Soul Act and Outstanding Achievement Awards.

After studying at the Identity Drama School, on 11 June 2009, Omar made his acting debut in Ché Walker's musical Been So Long. He was appointed Member of the Order of the British Empire (MBE) in the 2012 Birthday Honours for services to music. During July and August 2015, Omar appeared as part of the house band in the BBC Two comedy series The Javone Prince Show. In June 2017, Omar was one of the "Artists for Grenfell" who performed the number-one charity single "Bridge over Troubled Water", in aid of victims of the Grenfell Tower fire.

In January 2022, Omar contributed vocals to Berlin-based artist Le Commandant Couche-Tôt's track "L'été indien". In 2022, Omar was cast in the role of Avery Baker in the BBC soap opera EastEnders.

Personal life
Omar is sometimes credited as Omar Hammer. His birth father's surname is Lye-Fook, while his stepfather's surname is Hammer. He and his siblings—two brothers and a sister—are all musicians. Samia Lye-Fook, Omar's sister, and youngest of the four, has provided background vocals for some of Omar's recordings. Omar became the father of twin daughters in early 2008.

Discography

Albums

Singles

References

External links
 
 
 
 

1968 births
English people of Chinese descent
English people of Indian descent
English people of Jamaican descent
Male actors from London
Alumni of the Guildhall School of Music and Drama
People educated at Chetham's School of Music
Members of the Order of the British Empire
Neo soul singers
English soul singers
21st-century Black British male singers
Living people
Talkin' Loud artists
20th-century Black British male singers